Sphaerocylichna incommoda is a species of deepsea snail or bubble snail, a marine opisthobranch gastropod mollusk in the family Cylichnidae, the canoe bubbles or chalice bubble snails.

References

 Powell A. W. B., New Zealand Mollusca, William Collins Publishers Ltd, Auckland, New Zealand 1979 
 Burn R. (2006) A checklist and bibliography of the Opisthobranchia (Mollusca: Gastropoda) of Victoria and the Bass Strait area, south-eastern Australia. Museum Victoria Science Reports 10:1–42

Cylichnidae
Gastropods described in 1891